Britannia Barracks was a military installation in Norwich.

History
The barracks were built in the architectural style of Norman Shaw on Mousehold Heath as the depot for the Royal Norfolk Regiment between 1885 and 1887. The name of the barracks was taken from the badge of the Regiment. The barracks served as an Initial Training Centre for recruits during the Second World War. The Regiment remained at the barracks until it amalgamated with the Suffolk Regiment to form the 1st East Anglian Regiment in 1959. Most of the buildings survive as part of Norwich Prison.

References

Installations of the British Army
Barracks in England